West Mercia Police Authority was the governing body of the West Mercia Police force in the English counties of Herefordshire, Worcestershire, and Shropshire until November 2012.  Police authorities were replaced by directly elected police and crime commissioners.  The current police and crime commissioner for West Mercia is Bill Longmore.

Constitution
Police Authorities were usually a board of members consisting of local councillors and independent members appointed directly to serve in that role.

In West Mercia, the Police Authority had a membership of 17 people drawn from across the force area:
Nine members were Councillors, nominated by the lead local authorities in West Mercia.
Eight are Independent Members directly appointed (at least one of these members has to be a magistrate).
The Police Authority also had two co-opted Independent Members appointed to the Standards Committee.

See also
Police Authority

External links
Archive of the former West Mercia Police Authority official website
West Mercia Police and Crime Commissioner official website

References

Police authorities in England
2012 disestablishments in England